Garrick Football Club was an English association football club based in Sheffield, Yorkshire.

History
Garrick played between 1866 and 1878. They, along with the Wellington club, became the first clubs to play in the world's first two football competitions.  The club took its name from the Garrick Hotel where the club held its meetings. 

In the Youdan Cup, Garrick lost by one goal and one rouge to nothing at the Cremorne ground on London Road. The following year they entered the Cromwell Cup and after beating Wellington (apparently borrowing seven players from Heeley to ensure victory) they met the newly formed Wednesday in the final at Bramall Lane. In front of around 500 spectators the two clubs fought out a goalless draw. It was agreed to play extra time with the first team to score being the victor (thus becoming the first use of the Golden Goal), but Garrick lost when Wednesday scored a goal after 10 minutes.

Garrick then withdrew from playing the more popular local teams, instead taking on the minor teams and playing the occasional out-of-town match (including one of Sheffield's first rugby matches against Manchester Free Wanderers).

The club was reasonably active until 1877 but the last record of activity in the regular game is a failure to turn up to a friendly with Staveley F.C. in December that year; a one-off match in 1886 against the local pantomime actors seems to have been a scratch team using the name as a pun, as the contemporary Garrick Cricket Club was also made up of actors.

Colours

The club's colours were red, white, and blue; the style of multicoloured jerseys at the time was to arrange colours in hoops.

References

Defunct football clubs in South Yorkshire
Association football clubs established in 1866
Association football clubs disestablished in 1878
1866 establishments in England